Jonathan Foster may refer to:

People
Jonathan Foster (neuroscientist), attended Wolfson College, Oxford
Jonathan Foster (engineer), see Timeline of steam power
Jonathan Foster (politician), predecessor of Jonathan Sloane
Jonathan Foster (American football), played in 2009 Cleveland Browns season

Fictional characters
Jonny Foster, Jonathan Foster, Emmerdale character
Jonathan Foster, character in 12 Monkeys (TV series)

See also
Jon Foster (disambiguation)
John Foster (disambiguation)